Megacyclops is a genus of copepods, containing the following species:

Megacyclops brachypus Kiefer, 1955
Megacyclops donnaldsoni (Chappuis, 1929)
Megacyclops dussarti Pesce & Maggi, 1977
Megacyclops formosanus (Harada, 1931)
Megacyclops gigas (Claus, 1857)
Megacyclops kieferi (Chappuis, 1925)
Megacyclops languidoides (Lilljeborg, 1901)
Megacyclops languidus (G. O. Sars, 1863)
Megacyclops latipes (Lowndes, 1927)
Megacyclops magnus (Marsh, 1920)
Megacyclops minutus Claus, 1863
Megacyclops viridis (Jurine, 1820)

Megacyclops bicuspidatus (Claus, 1857) → Diacyclops bicuspidatus (Claus, 1857)
Megacyclops bisetosus (Rehberg, 1880) → Diacyclops bisetosus (Rehberg, 1880)
Megacyclops clandestinus (Kiefer, 1926) → Diacyclops clandestinus (Kiefer, 1926)
Megacyclops niceae (Mann, 1940) → Megacyclops viridis (Jurine, 1820)
Megacyclops robustus (G. O. Sars, 1863) → Acanthocyclops robustus (G. O. Sars, 1863)

References

Cyclopoida genera
Cyclopidae